Danylo Siianytsia (born September 9, 2000) is a Ukrainian-born pair skater who represents the United States. With his skating partner, Anastasiia Smirnova, he is the 2022 CS Golden Spin of Zagreb champion. They are also the 2021 U.S. junior national champions and finished in the top ten at two World Junior Championships.

Personal life 
Siianytsia was born on September 9, 2000, in Dnipro, Ukraine in the ukrainian family. He took a gap year between finishing high school and starting college to improve his English via lessons. Siianytsia came to the United States on the invitation of his current coach, Trudy Oltmanns, in 2016 on a P-1 visa and hopes to gain U.S. citizenship.

Siianytsia enjoys weightlifting and baking pecan pie.

Career

Early career 
Siianytsia began skating in 2003 in Dnipro. He competed at the national level in Ukraine but never received an international assignment. After moving to the United States to learn pairs with Oltmanns, he continued in men's singles for several seasons before expressing an interest in competing only in pairs. On switching nationalities, Siianytsia said: "I love representing the United States. I never got a chance to compete for Ukraine. But going out under Team USA has been pretty awesome."

Siianytsia's first pairs partner was Jasmine Wong, with whom he won the 2017 U.S. juvenile national bronze medalist. He skated in 2017–18 with Ariana LoPinto on the intermediate level but did not qualify to the 2018 U.S. Championships.

Siianytsia teamed up with Anastasiia Smirnova in mid-2018 after he found her profile on IcePartnerSearch and asked Oltmanns to arrange a tryout. She moved from Ukraine to train with Siianytsia under Oltmanns in Shakopee, Minnesota. They won the novice bronze medal in their first season together at the 2019 U.S. Championships.

2019–20 season 
Smirnova/Siianytsia made their junior international debut at 2019 JGP Russia, where they finished seventh overall. They then competed at the 2019–20 U.S. Pairs Final and won the bronze medal, qualifying them to the 2020 U.S. Championships. At the 2019 Golden Spin of Zagreb in December, Smirnova/Siianytsia earned their first international medal, silver behind Georgia's Butaeva/Berulava.

At the 2020 U.S. Championships, Smirnova/Siianytsia were third in the short program but won the free skate to earn the silver medal behind Finster/Nagy. As a result, they were named to the 2020 World Junior Championships team. Smirnova/Siianytsia finished tenth at the World Junior Championships.

2020–21 season 
After the COVID-19 pandemic in Minnesota caused their training rink to close, Smirnova/Siianytsia temporarily relocated with their coach to her old rink in Sioux Center, Iowa. The Junior Grand Prix, where they would have competed, was also affected by the COVID-19 pandemic and canceled.

In January, Smirnova/Siianytsia won the junior title at the 2021 U.S. Championships by over 20 points ahead of silver medalists Martins/Bedard, despite Smirnova suffering a high ankle sprain on her right leg in practice the day before competition began. Siianytsia reflected that they were "pretty excited" about the win and "hopefully, it won't be our last one."

2021–22 season 
Smirnova/Siianytsia returned to international competition on the Junior Grand Prix. They were fourth overall in Poland despite placing third in each segment and finished sixth in Austria. They also competed on the senior level for the first time, placing ninth at the Skating Club of Boston's Cranberry Cup. Both skaters contracted COVID-19 in December and withdrew from the 2022 U.S. Junior Championships.

Despite their absence from the national championships, Smirnova/Siianytsia were named to the American team for the 2022 World Junior Championships, which had been originally scheduled to be held in Sofia, but due to the pandemic were moved to Tallinn in mid-April. Due to Vladimir Putin's invasion of Ukraine, the International Skating Union banned all Russian athletes from competing at the event. This had a significant impact on the pairs field, long dominated by Russia. The invasion of their native country was a difficult experience for both, with both having family members still living there, some of whom evacuated to Poland. Siianytsia called it "terrifying for our family." Smirnova/Siianytsia placed third in the short program, winning a bronze small medal, their only error being Smirnova underrotating and stepping out of her double Axel. However, the free program proved to be difficult, with Siianytsia falling on both jumps, Smirnova falling on their second throw jump, and then their second lift aborted. They dropped to fourth place overall.

2022–23 season 
Moving to the international senior level full-time, Smirnova/Siianytsia made their Challenger debut at the 2022 CS Finlandia Trophy, where they finished in seventh place. Given two Grand Prix assignments, they were scheduled to make their debut at the 2022 Skate America but had to withdraw after Siianytsia suffered a groin injury. Despite this, they were able to attend their second event, the 2022 Grand Prix of Espoo, five weeks later. They finished second in the short program. However, they dropped to fourth place after the free skate.

Programs

With Smirnova

Competitive highlights 
GP: Grand Prix; CS: Challenger Series; JGP: Junior Grand Prix. Pewter medals (4th place) awarded only at U.S. national, sectional, and regional events.

For the United States

Pairs with Smirnova

Men's singles

Pairs with LoPinto

Pairs with Wong

For Ukraine

Men's singles

Detailed results 
ISU Personal Best highlighted in bold.

 With Smirnova

Senior results

Junior results

Novice results

References

External links 
 
 Anastasiia Smirnova and Danil Siianytsia at U.S. Figure Skating

2000 births
Living people
Ukrainian male pair skaters
Sportspeople from Dnipro
Ukrainian emigrants to the United States